The 1973–74 ABA season was the seventh and final season for the Denver Rockets before their name change in preparation for the merger with the NBA, which had a team called the Rockets. They ended up with a 37-47 record, but it was not enough for a playoff spot, due to losing a one-game playoff to the San Diego Conquistadors on March 29, 1974, 131–111. Subsequently, the team was rechristened the Denver Nuggets before the next season started.

Roster

Season standings

Eastern Division

Western Division

Game log
 1973-74 Denver Rockets Schedule and Results | Basketball-Reference.com

Statistics

Awards and honors
 Assist per game leader: Al Smith (8.1)
 Total assists: Al Smith (619)
 All-Defensive 1st team: Julius Keye
 All-Rookie Team: Mike Green
 All-Stars: Warren Jabali, Ralph Simpson,

Transactions

References

Denver Nuggets seasons
Denver
Denver Nuggets
Denver Nuggets